Gavrilo "Gavril" Stefanović Venclović (fl. 1680–1749) was a priest, writer, poet, orator, philosopher, neologist, polyglot, and illuminator. He was one of the first and most notable representatives of Serbian Baroque literature (although he worked in the first half of the 18th century, as Baroque trends in Serbian literature emerged in the late 17th century). Venclović's most important contributions as a scholar was in the development of the vernacular in what would a century later become the Serbian literary language. He is also remembered as one of the first Serbian enlighteners, student of Kiprijan Račanin.

Biography
Venclović was born to a Serbian family in Srem province, then part of the Hungarian kingdom. Little information about him is known. From the evidence he gave in his writings in 1735 it is known that he was then a senior citizen. A refugee from the Turkish army, he adopted the town of Szentendre as his home. It was there that he became a disciple of Kiprijan Račanin, who started a school for young monks, similar to the one in the municipality of Rača, near the river Drina, in Serbia.

Later, as a parish priest serving the Military Frontier communities in Hungary, Venclović advised his peers to use the people's idiom and abandon the Slavonic-Serbian language (славяносербскій / slavjanoserbskij or словенскій slovenskij; Serbian: славеносрпски / slavenosrpski), a form of the Serbian language which was used by an educated merchant class under the heavy influence of the Church Slavonic and Russian languages of that time.

The first Rača School in Srem was in the Monastery of St. Lucas. Venclović had acquired skills as a poet and icon painter. He also wrote and collected songs, and wrote Hagiography of Serbian saints. Archival records show that Venclović attended the Kyiv Mohyla Academy (now National University of Kyiv-Mohyla Academy) from 1711 to 1715 and then went to Győr, a city in northwest Hungary, where he became a parish priest at the Serbian Orthodox Church of St. Nicholas.

In 1739, during a time of religious persecution, he became a renowned speaker (slavni propovednik) to live among the Serbian Šajkaši in Komárom. He also played an influential role in politics.

He preached to the Orthodox Šajkaši and the Slavonian Military Frontier troops in 1746. He was loyal to the Habsburg monarch, and demanded others be loyal to the ruling family, and that they show respect for the military code (as inseparable from dynastic patriotism). Venclović appealed to the Šajkaši and soldiers alike to be devoted to the emperor, to refrain from abusing the weak, stealing, and betraying their comrades and fellow men-at-arms.

Literary work

At the beginning of the 18th century, Venclović translated some 20,000 pages of old biblical literature into vernacular Serbian.

Venclović's opus was vast, consisting of orations, biographies, church songs, poems, illuminations and illustrations of church books. His language was full of vernacular vitality yet able to express the inner, the subtle, and the transcendent. He was familiar with the works of contemporary Russian and Polish theologians. From Russian, he translated archbishop Lazar Baranovych's Mech Dukhovny (The Spiritual Sword), and from Polish, he translated Istorija Barona Cezara, kardinala rimskago.

The sway of Old Church Slavonic as the medieval literary language of all the Eastern Orthodox Slavs lasted many centuries. In Russia, it was obtained until the time of Peter the Great (1672–1725), and among the Serbs until the time of Venclović. He translated the bible from Old Slavonic to Old Serbian. Thus the Old Slavonic was relegated only to liturgical purposes. From then on, theology and church oratory and administration were carried on in Slavoserbian, a mixture of Old Slavic (Old Church Slavonic) in its Russian form with a popular Serbian rendering, until Vuk Karadžić, who was the first reformer to shake off the remnants of this ancient speech and to institute a phonetic orthography.

Neologisms 
Gavrilo Stefanović Venclović was among the first to use Serbian vernacular as a standard language for the purpose of writing sermons. After the Vuk type of written language had won, lexical gaps were filled mainly with words and expressions already present in the vernacular. This method provided a very limited stylistic and lexical inventory for the writers. Venclović's stylistic neologisms, possessing such qualities as picturesqueness and semantic transparency, served to draw the attention of the audience to the text of the sermon. Rooted in the biblical tradition, they represent a "bridge" between the Old Church Slavonic lexical legacy and the Serbian vernacular, as well as demonstrate the possibility for the creation of a standard language based on vernacular, without divorcement from the tradition of Cyril and Methodius.

Selected works
Slova izbrana
Udvorenje arhanđela Gavrila Devici Mariji
Šajkaši orations
The Spiritual Sword
Prayers Against Bloody Waters

See also
Čirjak Račanin (1660–1731), Serbian Orthodox monk and writer
Kiprijan Račanin (1650–1730), Serbian Orthodox monk and writer
Jerotej Račanin (1650–1727), Serbian Orthodox monk and writer
Teodor Račanin (1500–1560), Serbian Orthodox monk and writer
Simeon Račanin ( 1676–1700), Serbian Orthodox monk and writer
Hristifor Račanin (1595–1670), Serbian Orthodox monk and writer
Jefrem Janković Tetovac

References

Sources
 Milorad Pavić: Gavril Stefanović Venclović, 1980, Belgrade 
 Jovan Skerlić, Istorija Nove Srpske Književnosti / History of New Serbian Literature (Belgrade, 1914, 1921), pp. 28–29.

External links
 Gavrilo Stefanović Venclović profile, rastko.org; accessed 26 December 2016.

18th-century Eastern Orthodox theologians
18th-century Serbian people
Christian writers
Eastern Orthodox Christians from Serbia
Eastern Orthodox theologians
Habsburg Serbs
People from Srem District
Refugees of the Great Turkish War
Serbian Orthodox clergy
Serbian male poets
Serbian theologians
Year of birth unknown
Year of death unknown
Baroque writers